Tenebroides mauritanicus, commonly known as the cadelle, is a cosmopolitan and common pest in storehouses and granaries. Adults and larvae feed on grain and grain products, prey upon other insects infesting grain, and bore into wood. They typically pupate in wood cavities that they make. It is one of the longest lived insects that attacks stored grain and is very destructive and easily dispersed. It is also one of the largest (body length 10 mm.).

The larvae were nicknamed "bargemen" by sailors because they frequently infested ships' biscuits and were noticed when they would crawl out of the biscuits and onto the "barge", a small tub used to hold biscuits on the mess table.

References

External links

University of Kentucky
ZinRus Very high quality image.

See also Home stored product entomology

Tenebrionidae
Beetles described in 1758
Cosmopolitan arthropods